Arms deal may refer to:

 Arms trafficking
Al-Yamamah arms deal
 Bofors scandal
 Egyptian-Czech arms deal
 South African Arms Deal
 2017 United States-Saudi Arabia arms deal

See also
 Arms industry